Downtown Historic District in Galesville, Wisconsin is a historic district that was listed on the National Register of Historic Places in 1984.

References

Commercial buildings on the National Register of Historic Places in Wisconsin
Geography of Trempealeau County, Wisconsin
Historic districts on the National Register of Historic Places in Wisconsin
National Register of Historic Places in Trempealeau County, Wisconsin